The Armenian Athletic Federation (Armenian Հայաստանի Աթլետիկայի Ֆեդերացիա) is the governing body for the sport of athletics in Armenia. The headquarters of the Federation is located in Yerevan.

Affiliations 
The Armenian Athletic Federation is a member of:
International Association of Athletics Federations (IAAF)
European Athletic Association (EAA)
Armenian Olympic Committee

National records 
The Armenian Athletic Federation maintains the Armenian records in athletics.

See also
 Sport in Armenia

External links 
Official webpage
Armenian Athletic Federation on Facebook

Armenia
National members of the International Association of Athletics Federations
Sports governing bodies in Armenia
National governing bodies for athletics
Athletic sports